Hugh Jones is a British record producer with many important post-punk, new wave and alternative rock albums to his credit.

Career
In the early 1970s, Jones worked as an apprentice engineer in IBC Studios in Central London, while acting as lead singer in the band Mistral. He made his name in the early 1980s, with a jangly sound that was better received than those of many of his contemporaries. Though many of his early clients were big-name acts—Echo & the Bunnymen, the Sound, Modern English, and the Damned, for example—his recent production credits have been more esoteric, though many admire his work with the Charlatans and Kitchens of Distinction.

Jones was later closely associated with Rockfield Studios in Wales and recorded many of his most successful records there including those of Simple Minds, Echo & the Bunnymen, the Damned, Dumptruck, the Icicle Works, the Charlatans, Heidi Berry, Del Amitri, the Bluetones, Shack and Gene.

Production credits

1970s
1973 - Return to Forever - Light as a Feather (engineer)
1976 - Ralph McTell - Another Star Ascending (The Boxer) (engineer)
1977 - London - Animal Games (engineer)
1979 - Simple Minds - Real to Real Cacophony (engineer)
1980s
1980 - Adam and the Ants - Kings of the Wild Frontier (engineer)
1980 - The Teardrop Explodes - Kilimanjaro (engineer)
1980 - Simple Minds - Empires and Dance (engineer)
1981 - Simple Minds - Sons and Fascination/Sister Feelings Call (engineer)
1981 - Echo & the Bunnymen - Heaven Up Here
1981 - The Sound - From the Lions Mouth
1981 - The Undertones - Positive Touch
1982 - Fiat Lux - several singles & one mini album (Hired History)
1983 - Clock DVA - Advantage
1983 - Monsoon - Third Eye (co-producer and engineer)
1982 - Modern English - After the Snow
1982 - The Damned - Strawberries
1984 - The Icicle Works - The Icicle Works
1984 - Modern English - Ricochet Days
1984 - Rubber Rodeo - Scenic Views
1985 - The Icicle Works - The Small Price of a Bicycle (one track)
1985 - The Colourfield - Virgins and Philistines
1985 - Stan Ridgway - The Big Heat (two tracks)
1985 - Del Amitri - Del Amitri
1986 - Here's Johnny - Hellzapoppin
1986 - I Can Crawl - Desert (two tracks)
1986 - Stump - Quirk Out
1986 - That Petrol Emotion - Manic Pop Thrill
1986 - Siouxsie and the Banshees - Tinderbox (engineer)
1987 - Balaam & the Angel - Greatest Story Ever Told
1987 - The Saints - All Fools Day
1987 - Dumptruck - For the Country
1988 - James - Strip-mine
1988 - Roe - Hombre (Single)
1988 - Stump - A Fierce Pancake
1988 - Voice of the Beehive - Let It Bee
1989 - Frazier Chorus - Sue
1989 - Mary My Hope - Suicide Kings
1989 - Del Amitri - Waking Hours
1989 - James Ray and the Performance - Dust Boat
1990s
1990 - Vagabond Joy - Baby's Not a Guru
1990 - Kitchens of Distinction - Strange Free World
1990 - Ultra Vivid Scene - Joy 1967-1990
1990 - The Connells - One Simple Word
1991 - Died Pretty - Doughboy Hollow
1991 - Vagabond Joy - We're Going Home
1992 - Richard Barone - Clouds Over Eden
1992 - The Charlatans - Between 10th and 11th
1992 - Pale Saints - In Ribbons
1993 - Heidi Berry - Heidi Berry
1993 - Died Pretty - Trace
1994 - The Glee Club - Mine
1994 - Pale Saints - Slow Buildings
1994 - Dodgy - Homegrown
1994 - The Family Cat - Magic Happens
1996 - The Bluetones - Expecting to Fly
1996 - Heidi Berry - Miracle
1996 - Dodgy - Free Peace Sweet
1997 - The Mutton Birds - Envy of Angels
1998 - The Bluetones - Return to the Last Chance Saloon
1999 - Gene - Revelations
1999 - Shack - HMS Fable
1999 - Dream City Film Club - Stranger Blues
2000s
2001 - Gene - Libertine
2002 - The Charlatans - Songs from the Other Side
2002 - Easyworld - This Is Where I Stand
2004 - Obi - Diceman Lopez
2005 - Echo & the Bunnymen - Siberia
2006 - The Bluetones - The Bluetones
2006 - Harrisons - No Fighting in the War Room
2006 - My Elvis Blackout - Back in the Food Chain (EP)
2007 - My Elvis Blackout - Six Tracks (EP)
2007 - I Say Marvin - Powerdown!
2008 - I Say Marvin - Gloria
2010 - Modern English - Soundtrack

References

English record producers
English audio engineers
Living people
Year of birth missing (living people)
Place of birth missing (living people)